The 1975 Preakness Stakes was the 100th running of the $210,000 Grade 1 Preakness Stakes thoroughbred horse race. The race took place on May 17, 1975, and was televised in the United States on the CBS television network. Master Derby, who was jockeyed by Darrel McHargue, won the race by one length over runner-up Foolish Pleasure. Approximate post time was 5:40 p.m. Eastern Time. The race was run on a fast track in a final time of 1:56-2/5. The Maryland Jockey Club reported total attendance of 75,216, this is recorded as second highest on the list of American thoroughbred racing top attended events for North America in 1975.

Payout 

The 100th Preakness Stakes Payout Schedule

$2 Exacta:  (4–5) paid   $111.60

The full chart 

 Winning Breeder: Robert E. Lehmann; (KY)
 Winning Time: 1:56 2/5
 Track Condition: Fast
 Total Attendance: 75,216

References

External links 
 

1975
1975 in horse racing
1975 in American sports
1975 in sports in Maryland
May 1975 sports events in the United States
Horse races in Maryland